The 2007 CEMAC Cup was the fourth edition of the CEMAC Cup, the football championship of Central African nations.

The tournament was held in from 4 March to 16 March in Ndjamena, Chad.

Group round

Group A

Group B

Knockout round

Semi-finals

3rd place playoff

Final

References
Details at RSSSF archives

CEMAC Cup
CEMAC Cup, 2007
CEMAC Cup
CEMAC